KRIM-LP (96.3 FM) is a radio station licensed to serve Payson, Arizona.  The community-oriented station is owned by Payson Council For The Musical Arts Inc. It airs a hits from the 1950s thru the 1990s. The station's general manager is Chris Higgins.

KRIM is an affiliate of the syndicated Pink Floyd program "Floydian Slip."

The station was assigned the KRIM-LP call letters by the Federal Communications Commission on June 5, 2002.

References

External links
 KRIM-LP official website
 
 KRIM-LP service area per the FCC database

RIM-LP
Adult album alternative radio stations in the United States
Jazz radio stations in the United States
Classical music radio stations in the United States
RIM-LP
Mass media in Gila County, Arizona
Radio stations established in 2002
2002 establishments in Arizona
Classic hits radio stations in the United States